Petar Banićević (8 February 1930 – 4 September 2006) was a Serbian actor.

The "Petar Banićević" award is given annually by the National Theatre in Belgrade to a young actor under 40 years of age who excels artistically.

Selected filmography

Film

Television

Accolades
In December 2004, he received the Life Achievement Award "Dobričin prsten" for his roles in Yugoslav theatres.

References

External links

1930 births
2006 deaths
Actors from Nikšić
Serbian male actors
Serbs of Montenegro
Laureates of the Ring of Dobrica
Serbian male television actors
Serbian male stage actors
Serbian male film actors
Serbian male voice actors